Stradal refers to August Stradal, a Czech musical artist. It may also refer to:

 Emmy Stradal (1877–1925), Austrian politician
 Stradal House, historic house in Kansas, USA